Household hardware (or simply, hardware) is equipment that can be touched or held by hand such as keys, locks, nuts, screws, washers,  hinges, latches, handles, wire, chains, belts, plumbing supplies, electrical supplies, tools, utensils, cutlery and machine parts.  Household hardware is typically sold in hardware stores.

See also
 Builders hardware

References

 
 
Equipment
Locksmithing
Wire
Chains
Plumbing
Electrical wiring
Tools
Painting materials